Bachhraj Vyas (1916 – March 1972) was an Indian politician. He was the President of the Bharatiya Jana Sangh in 1965.  He was a member of the Maharashtra Legislative Council from 1958 to 1962.

References

Bharatiya Jana Sangh politicians
1916 births
1972 deaths
Members of the Maharashtra Legislative Council